Teatro Villa-Lobos is a theatre in Rio de Janeiro, Brazil. Government-funded,  the Villa-Lobos Theatre opened its doors on March 8, 1979.

References

Theatres in Rio de Janeiro (city)
1979 establishments in Brazil